"The Little Girl Sold with the Pears" (Italian: La bambina venduta con le pere) is an Italian fairy tale published by Italo Calvino in Italian Folktales, from Piedmont. Ruth Manning-Sanders included a variant, as "The Girl in the Basket", in A Book of Ogres and Trolls.

Synopsis
Once there was a man had to pay the king rent in the form of four baskets of pears. One year his trees yielded only three and a half baskets full, so he put his youngest daughter in the fourth basket to fill it up. When the baskets arrived at the castle, the royal servants found the girl by the pears she ate, and they set her to work as a servant. As the girl, named Perina (from pear), grew up, she and the prince fell in love, which caused the other maidservants to grow envious. In Manning-Sander's version, the servants told the king that she had boasted of doing all the laundry in one day; with the prince's aid, she was able to do it.
In most other versions, the maids then tell the king that she had also boasted that she could steal the witch's (or ogress's, depending on the version) treasure. The king insisted that she do it.

In Manning-Sanders's version the prince told her what to do. Although Calvino found this in his original version, to increase her identification with the pears, she went and passed by an apple tree and a peach tree to sleep in the third, a pear tree. In the morning, a little old woman was under the tree.

In both cases, they gave her grease, bread, and millet. She went on, gave the millet to three women in a bakery, sweeping out the ovens with their hair, threw the bread to some mastiffs, crossed by a red river with a charm that the little old woman had given her, and greased the hinges of the witch's house. Then she took the treasure chest. The chest began to speak, but the door refused to slam on her, the river to drown her, the dogs to eat her, and the women in the bakery to bake her.

Curious, she opened the chest and a golden hen with her chicks escaped, or musical instruments that played on their own, but the little old woman or prince put them back. The prince told her to ask, for her reward, for the coal chest in the cellar. When she asked and it was brought up, the prince was hidden in it, so they married.

Source
The tale was originally collected by Italian scholar Domenico Comparetti with the title Margheritina, and sourced from Monferrato. It was later translated by German writer Paul Heyse into German.

The tale was reworked by Calvino, who changed the girl's name from Margheritina to Perina to reinforce the fruit connection. He also added the old woman helper who gives the objects to the girl, while, in the original tale, the girl is helped by the prince.

Analysis

Tale type
In a review of Calvino's work, folklorist Walter Anderson classified the tale, according to the international Aarne-Thompson-Uther Index, as type AaTh 428, "The Wolf". Swedish scholar  also classified the original  tale as type AaTh 428.

Calvino's tale (numbered 11 in his collection) was listed by Italian scholars  and Liliana Serafini under type AaTh 428, Il Lupo ("The Wolf").

Tale type AaTh 428 is considered by scholars as a fragmentary version of the tale of Cupid and Psyche, lacking the initial part about the animal husband and corresponding to the part of the witch's tasks. Accordingly, German folklorist Hans-Jörg Uther revised the international classification system and subsumed type AaTh 428 under new type ATU 425B, "Son of the Witch".

Variants 
Author Angelo de Gubernatis collected a tale from Santo Stefano di Calcinaia with the title La comprata ("The Bought One"). In this tale, a couple accidentally sells a fruits basket with their daughter inside, which is bought by another couple. The second couple's son and the girl fall in love and plan to marry, but the boy's mother is against their marriage, and imposes tasks on the girl: first, the girl is to separate the legumes mixed inside in a granary. With the help of an old lady, she fulfills the task. Next, the woman orders the girl to sew, wash and weave one hundred pounds of hemp in a single month. The same old lady appears to her, joined by three other ladies with large body parts, and they fulfill the task. Still trying to separate the enamoured couple, the woman curses her son to become a pig. The old lady appears to the girl and tells her how to disenchant her beloved. Following the lady's advice, she walks down a path and passes by a gate whose hinges she blesses; then by a woman pulling a bucket of water with her hair, to whom she gives a rope; gives two brooms with two woman that are sweeping the floor with their tongues; gives a rag to another woman that is cleaning an oven with her breasts; and gives some meat to two lions. Finally, she arrives at the house of a mago (sorcerer) that is guarding his treasure with his eyes open (which is their way of sleeping). The girl steals the mago's treasure and runs back, the obstacles in their way allowing her passage. The mago wakes up and, not seeing his treasure, dies. The boy's mother also dies, and his transformation is reversed, allowing him to marry his beloved.

See also

 La Fada Morgana (Catalan folk tale)
 Prunella
 The Tale about Baba-Yaga (Russian fairy tale)
 The Man and the Girl at the Underground Mansion
 The King of Love
 Pájaro Verde (Mexican folktale)
Boots and the Troll
Dapplegrim
The Enchanted Canary
The Magic Swan Geese
The Old Witch
The Three Aunts
The Witch
Thirteenth

References

Female characters in fairy tales
Italian fairy tales
Witchcraft in fairy tales
Stories within Italian Folktales
ATU 400-459